"The River" is a song by alternative rock group Live, which was released as the first single from their album, Songs from Black Mountain (2006).

The song was not released as a commercially purchasable single in the United States and failed to chart on Billboard's Hot 100 Airplay chart, but peaked at #33 on the Billboard Hot Adult Top 40 Tracks chart.

Track listings

Australian and European CD singles
"The River" (Radio Edit) – 3:00
"The River" (Acoustic Version) – 2:58
"Get Ready" (Acoustic Version) – 2:58

European CD single 2
"The River" – 3:00
"The River" (Video)

Charts

Weekly charts

Year-end charts

References

Songs about rivers
Live (band) songs
2006 singles
Songs written by Ed Kowalczyk
2006 songs
Radioactive Records singles